Hoodstar is the third studio album by the hip hop artist Chingy, following the release of Powerballin'. Released on September 19, 2006, the disc is split into two sides with different musical styles. While the "Hood" segment has the tracks "Hands Up" and "Cadillac Door", "Star" has more uptempo and club-oriented tracks like "Brand New Kicks" and "Dem Jeans". The guest features are by Three 6 Mafia, Chopper and Chingy's cousin Young Spiffy. The album was produced by Jermaine Dupri, Timbaland, the Trak Starz, Mannie Fresh, Mr. Collipark and the dance group Hoodstarz, among others. The album entered the Billboard 200 at number 9 with first week sales of 77,000 copies in the US. It was certified Gold by RIAA for shipping over 500,000 copies in the US.

Singles
The first official single was "Pullin' Me Back", featuring the R&B singer/actor Tyrese. The second single was "Dem Jeans", featuring Jermaine Dupri.

Critical reception

Hoodstar garnered mixed reviews from music critics. On Metacritic, which assigns a normalized rating out of 100 to reviews from mainstream critics, the album received an average score of 41, based on 11 reviews.

Steve 'Flash' Juon of RapReviews commended the production and featured guests for providing appeal for Chingy, despite an overreliance on his St. Louis accented gimmick to overcompensate for his lack of charisma, concluding that "You can call it silly if you like, but you can't say that Chingy hasn't found a niche and laid fucking DEEP in its cut. As such I suspect Hoodstar will be another successful album for the man with pennies in his name, regardless of critical acclaim. He'll keep on reppin' St. Louis to the death and you can't fault him for that." Thomas Golianopoulos of Spin said of the record, "Despite Chingy’s love for sneakers, freaky girls, and packed dance floors, the most memorable songs on his third album are decidedly buzz killers: "Pullin' Me Back" is a gloomy breaking-up-is- hard-to-do anthem crafted by superproducer Jermaine Dupri, and on the surprisingly candid "Cadillac Door," the St. Louis rapper laments lost friends. Of course, sandwiched between the two is the more familiar "Dem Jeans," an ode to, yup, women in tight jeans."

Jon Caramanica, reviewing for Blender, found the album inconsistent throughout its track listing and caused Chingy to run out of steam musically, concluding that, "At his best, Chingy raps in a whimsical tone that becomes a melodic element in its own right, and he delivers the odd sharp pick-up line: "I bet you had to jump up and down just to put 'em on," he leers on "Dem Jeans." But mostly he just sounds bored, a pretty boy tired of being denied his inner turmoil." Michael Harris of XXL criticized the record for its continued use of the typical hip-hop formula and Chingy's persona for delivering generic party tracks, concluding that "Although Chingy isn’t ready to cash out just yet, Hoodstar, is another losing hand." Hua Hsu of Rolling Stone found the album to be more of the same from Chingy's previous efforts but found him being overshadowed by the guest artists instead of being on the same level.

Track listing

Hood Side

Star Side

Charts

Weekly charts

Year-end charts

References

External links

2006 albums
Chingy albums
Capitol Records albums
Albums produced by Jermaine Dupri
Albums produced by Mannie Fresh
Albums produced by Mr. Collipark
Albums produced by Timbaland